Diyae-Edinne Jermoumi (born 19 July 2004) is a professional footballer who plays for Jong Ajax. Born in the Netherlands, he is a youth international for Morocco.

Club career 
Having started his career at Lugdunum in Leiden, Diyae-Edinne Jermoumi joined Sparta Rotterdam in 2014, before switching to Ajax Youth Academy in 2019, signing his first professional contract with the club from Amsterdam in December 2021.

Jermoumi made his professional debut for Jong Ajax on the 10 January 2022, replacing Giovanni at 74th minute of a 0–2 away Eerste Divisie win against Jong Utrecht.

International career
Born in the Netherlands, Jermoumi is of Moroccan descent and was under-17 selection. He debuted with the Morocco U20s in a friendly 2–0 loss to the Spain U20s on 28 April 2022.

References

External links

2004 births
Living people
Footballers from Leiden
Moroccan footballers
Morocco youth international footballers
Dutch footballers
Dutch sportspeople of Moroccan descent
Association football defenders
Jong Ajax players
Eerste Divisie players